Caloy is a nickname for Carlos in the Philippines. Notable people known by this name include the following:

Caloy Balcells, nickname for Carlos Balcells (fl. 1985–present), Spanish Filipino bass guitar player
Caloy Garcia, nickname for Carlos Jose Garcia (born 1975) Filipino professional basketball coach
Caloy Loyzaga, nickname for Carlos Loyzaga (1930 – 2016). Filipino basketball player and coach

See also

Caló (surname)
Calò (surname)
Cally (disambiguation)
Calo (disambiguation)
Calon (disambiguation)
Calor (disambiguation)